B4U is a television network focused on Bollywood based entertainment. The network operates the six channels B4U Music, B4U Movies, B4U Kadak, B4U Bhojpuri, B4U Aflam and B4U Plus which are at present available on more than 8 different satellites, in more than 100 countries in the Americas, Europe, Middle East, Africa, and Asia. In addition, the company operates B4U Motion Pictures, which is a media and entertainment production subsidiary.

Company history

In 1999, the newly formed network launched B4U Movies and B4U Music in the UK on the Sky Digital platform as a subscription package along with Sony Entertainment Television. The launch was surrounded by controversy, with rival network Zee TV claiming that B4U had stolen its database of subscribers in the UK. The B4U management claimed that they had got hold of the database from ex-employees and have been using it to send mailers promoting its service. In 2001, the network went on to launch the channels in the United States and Canada and the Middle East by the end of the year.

By 2000, B4U had established itself as a leading brand in Bollywood entertainment for the Indian Diaspora.  B4U signed a deal with FTV to broadcast Indian fashion shows throughout the world as well as more local events. In 2001, the network won 9 Promax Awards. The network then ventured into movie production in 2002, co-producing all films produced by iDream.

Television channels

B4U Today
The network was the media sponsor Mayor of London's 2007 Diwali Festival in Trafalgar Square.

B4U Films
B4U Films (alternatively named, B4U Productions Plc.) is a wholly owned subsidiary of B4U TV Ltd. (B4U), Mumbai based media and entertainment production company. It was started in 1997, and handles the motion picture production and distribution of B4U.

B4U Films produces films in Bollywood as well as in Punjab, where it partners with other leading film studios. They distribute Lollywood movies as well.

It first produced Bhai, which starred Suniel Shetty, Kader Khan and Kunal Khemu. In 2015 they started distributing Pakistani films by distributing Karachi Se Lahore worldwide. The latest film, they had distributed was Mahira Khan starred Pakistani romantic comedy film 7 Din Mohabbat In.

List of B4U films

References

External links
 B4U official site
 B4U group site

Foreign television channels broadcasting in the United Kingdom
Television stations in India
British Indian mass media
Television channels and stations established in 1999
Hindi cinema
1999 establishments in the United Kingdom
Television broadcasting companies of India
Mass media companies of India
Television networks in India
Broadcasting